Coffea charrieriana, also known as Charrier coffee, is a species of flowering plant from the Coffea genus. It is a caffeine-free coffee plant endemic to Cameroon in Central Africa. It is the first recorded caffeine-free Coffea in Central Africa, and the second to be recorded in Africa. The first caffeine-free species was previously discovered in Kenya, named C. pseudozanguebariae. The International Institute for Species Exploration at Arizona State University and a committee of taxonomists and scientists voted the C. charrieriana as one of the top 10 species described in 2008.

Taxonomy
Coffea  charrieriana is classified under the Rubiaceae family and the genus of Coffea. They are currently 120 species of Coffea spread in tropical Africa and Asia, in which two species; Coffea arabica and Coffea canephora dominate worldwide coffee plant production, making up 99% of produce.

Distribution and habitat
This plant is endemic to West Cameroon in the Bakossi Forest Reserve. It grows in a habitat of wet rainforest on rocky slopes of an altitude of 160m and a mean elevation range of 300m. It is highly threatened by deforestation for logging and palm oil production in its vulnerable lowland forest habitat.

History
Coffea charrieriana was discovered in 2008 and the findings were published in a paper named “A new caffeine-free coffee from Cameroon” to the Botanical Journal of the Linnean Society.  The plant was named by authors of the paper, Piet Stoffelen and Francois Anthony in honour of Professor A. Charrier who had made significant efforts towards the coffee industry. His work included leading the coffee breeding research and collection at Institute Research for Development (IRD) for the last 30 years of the 20th century. He also held a position at the French Office of Genetic Resources (BRG) from 1988 to 1993. He is currently working as the director of research at National Institute for Agricultural Research (INRA),focusing on plant genetics and breeding.

As a result of collaboration from Institute of Research for Development (IRD), Biodiversity International, Paris Museum of Natural History and the French Agricultural Research Centre in 1966–1987, coffee plants from Madagascar, Comoros, Mascarene Islands, Guinea, Ivory Coast, Cameroon, Central Africa, Congo, Ethiopia, Kenya and Tanzania were collected. The cuttings from C. charrieriana were first collected in 1985 from Bakossi Forest Reserve in Cameroon in Central Africa along with 70 other Coffea species, many that were already taxonomically identified. Though the C. charrieriana was identified to be morphologically different to previously identified Coffea species, further work was not done until 1997. In 1997 the cuttings were sent to Institute of Research for Development (IRD) in which further study such as observations of seed coat, anatomical observations of the leaves and biochemical analysis was undertaken. It wasn't until 2008 that after morphological and genetic studies of this species, was it recognised as a new species of Coffea. Genotyping analysis reveals C. charrieriana to have diverged from a common ancestor 11.15 million years ago.

Description 
Coffea charrieriana can grow up to a range of 5-10m in height and spreads 5-7m. The shrubs can grow to 1-1.5m high., whilst the branchlets are 1-2mm in diameter. The stipules have tiny hairs at the top and overlap each other and are deltate to triangular in shape and 2mm long. The C. charrieriana has small and thin leaves that are elliptical in frame. The base of the leaf is slightly wedged in shape whilst the apex of the leaf tapers to a round tip. This tapering point is roughly 7-13mm long. Both the top and bottom of the leaf surface is free of hair and smooth. The leaves petioles are 2mm long. Its leaf blades are 4–8 cm (length) x 2.2 – 3.5 cm (breath) in dimensions and features 3-7 secondary nerve cells per side of the midvein. The tertiary veins are reticulated, having a thread-like structure. The leaf also has domatia structures which are hairless. Anatomically, the leaf structure consists of an upper epidermis (20-30 μm), palisade mesophyll (20-30 μm), spongy mesophyll (45-70 μm), and lower epidermis (10-20 μm). This structure is quite similar to the ones found in other Coffea species. However comparatively to other Coffea species, the leaves are thin at 100-130μm thick and contain very few secondary nerves. These properties differ from other Coffea species specifically found in Central Africa, and resemble that of P.ebracteolatus, a wild species found in Africa. The size of the individual leaf structure components are also much smaller than the average seen in most other Coffea species. In addition, this abnormally small leaf characteristic is one of three known in Central Africa, along with C.anthonyi and C.kapakata.

There are 1-2 inflorescence per stem and each inflorescence contains one flower and two calyculi. The calyculi is divided into upper and lower structures. The lower calyculus has a rim shape with 2 smaller leave lobes. The upper calyculus has two broadly triangular shaped stipulars and two narrowly shaped elliptical foliar lobes. This plant consists fruits that are drupes in nature that each contain two pyrenes, with one seed per pyrene. The fruit is connected to a hairless peduncle that is 2mm long. The red and flesh] fruit is 9-10mm x 7mm in size whilst the coffee seed inside is elliptic in shape and covered in a seed coat made from parenchymatous. Comparatively to other Coffea species, the C.charrieriana lacks sclereids in its seed coat, the absence of sclereids is seen in plants of the genus Psilanthus and other Madagascan species. The seed measures 5mm long x 4mm wide x 3mm thick. Characteristic of a Coffea species, the seed is rounded, smooth and grooved. The flowers have no stalk and consists of 5 petals. The white corolla tube is 1mm long while the lobes are 5-8mm long and 2-3mm broad. The flower's gynoecium is a small disc that sits on the top of the ovary and surrounded by a truncated, smooth calyx limb. The characteristics of the flower closely match those of the Coffea genus. In the flower, the anthers and style protrude out, the anthers are also attached to the corolla. The short filament that connects to the zone between the tube, lobes and corolla is not semi-transparent, making it a distinct species from closely related genus Psilanthus in which this section is generally semi-transparent in colour. The C.charrieriana also possesses a corolla tube (1mm long), style (10mm long), two lobed stigma (2mm long), anther (3mm long) and anther filament (2mm long). The size of the corolla tube, corolla lobes and anthers differ from other known Coffea species from Central Africa.

Biochemistry
Biochemical analysis of the seeds reveals that they are caffeine-free, this caffeine-free biochemical characteristic is generally found in Madagascan Coffea species. Studies reported 30 out of 47 Madagascan Coffea species had very little or no traces of caffeine. It is the second caffeine-free species, along with C.pseudozanguebariae which grows in a coastal dry forest near the Indian ocean. It is suggested that the absence of caffeine in the Coffea species is due to spliceosome deficiency. Though the plants contain the necessary genes to produce caffeine, due to a malfunction in the protein synthesis pathway as a result of incorrect splicing patterns, caffeine is not produced. Caffeine absence is caused by a monogenic inheritance pattern, with the involvement of one gene and two alleles, the plant containing the recessive allele leads to no caffeine content. On the other hand, it is likely that caffeine production level is controlled by polygenic inheritance and the amount of caffeine produced is a genetic factor. Through further analysis, it was found that instead of accumulation of caffeine, the deficient caffeine synthase gene responsible for caffeine production had instead produced a substance called theobromine in its place. This discovery by scientists led to further understanding about the genetics of caffeine in Coffea plants, and the ability to hybridize coffee plants with caffeine-free plants to produce a decaf line of seeds with lower caffeine concentrations. It also opened up the option of removing this particular gene in plants containing caffeine to create a caffeine-free plant.

Compared to other Coffea, C. charrieriana along with C. canephora and C. mannii has significantly lower linoleic acid percentage. The C.charrieriana also had the lowest polyunsaturated fatty acid content (<30%)  and 0.8% dry matter basis. As a result, though originating from Africa, the C. charrieriana is closer phylogenetically to Madagascan, than African species (Dussert et al. 2008, 2953). By examining C. charrieriana's leaf components, it forms a separate gene cluster to the C. anthonyi, C. arabica, C. canephora, C. humilis, C. kapakata, C liberica, C. liberica var liberica and C. mannii.  C. charrieriana also has lower caffeoylquinic acids (CQA) than other Coffea species  From analysing the fatty acid content alone, the C.charrieriana is most closely related to C.congensis and forms a separate clade from the other 59 Coffea genotypes.

Further genetic analysis of long tandem repeat retrotransposons (LTR-RT), more specifically of the lineages SIRE and Del were analysed for the C.charrieriana. LTR-RT are redundant sections of the plant genome. It was found that whilst other West and Central African Coffea species contained 4.5-5.1% of SIRE lineage, the C.charrieriana contained 3.2%. In addition, the C.charrieriana also had the lowest percentage of Del fraction, at 13.1% compared to 14–16.2% found in other West and Central African species. This suggests that with the observations of SIRE and Del, the C.charrieriana is genetically distinct to its geographical counterpart species.

Coffea charrieriana also has the largest chloroplast genome within the Coffea genus. When clustering the 52 species from Coffea and Psilanthus, the C.charrieriana, along with another species, the P.travancorensis, were excluded from the clusters due to poor analysis results. Though the C.charrieriana originates from Cameroon, genetic results suggest a placement of the C.charrieriana between the two genus of Psilanthus and Coffea. It is genetically similar to West and Central African Coffea species but shares morphological similarities with Psilanthus, such as its vegetation. The difficulty in grouping C.charrieriana is likely the result of ancient hybridisation between the C.charrieriana and a Psilanthus chloroplast, leading to a mixed genome.

Alkaloids are found in many plants including coffee and tea but only very little amounts were present in the C.charrieriana.

Cultivation and use
Coffea charrieriana grows in wet places with plenty of sunshine. During dry periods, the species undergoes floral bud morphogenesis but the flowering buds do not emerge until the next rainfall event. After rain, a flowering event was seen in 7 days. The time it takes for flowering of all Coffea species ranges from 5–13 days, making correct timing of hybridization difficult.

Similar to other Coffea species, the fleshy fruit of the C. charrieriana contains edible beans. These can be prepared by drying, roasting or grinding, generally to make coffee. As a naturally occurring caffeine-free coffee, it provides an alternative over artificially decaffeinated coffee. With increasing demand for decaffeinated coffee, methods such as plant hybridization between coffee-free species, biotechnology interference of genetics and chemical extraction have been used to artificially decrease caffeine content. Generally, the presence of caffeine acts on the tastebuds, giving caffeinated products a distinct flavour, so as a caffeine-free species, C.charrieriana may not be preferable to coffee drinkers who prefer the taste provided by caffeine. The C.charrieriana can be used in plant hybridization as the theobromine can be transferable between breeds, allowing caffeine concentration to be altered when crossed with a species containing caffeine. Seeds from the C.charrieriana are currently being developed to become the first naturally caffeine-free coffee available on the market, this bean being coined the name Decaffito by Brazilian developers.

Another possible use of C.charrieriana is extracting 5-caffeoylquinic acids (CQA) from the coffee leaves as for most Coffea species, including the C. charrieriana, there contains natural antioxidant compounds. This natural antioxidant can be used in food and nutraceuticals.

Coffea Diversa Farm in Costa Rica is currently cultivating C. charrieriana.

References

The plant was growing in black slavery houses (14 february 1469)
Www.coffe.plant.com

During the second sudanese civil war, the charrieriana plant had a great impact on the slave trade market. This was due to the amount of black abolitionists (18th April 1984).

www.maduras/a/2-km/.telecom

External links

charreriana
Flora of Cameroon
Plants described in 2008